Melani Emperatriz Montoya Horna, also known as Mia Mont (born November 3, 1989 in Lima, Peru) is a singer and songwriter who is of Peruvian origin. Mia is popular for singing the Spanish version of 'Dhoom Machale' song in Dhoom 3.

Career

First album 
She worked on her first album of hand with Ed Montoya, composing the first songs of their debut album Antifantasía with a team formed by music producer Ed Montoya, who embodied an innovative sound, Germán Villacorta (Juan Gabriel, Eva Ayllon) in recording, Reuven "Paquirri" Amiel, in the mixture and Dave Collins (Madonna, The Police, No Doubt, Linkin Park), in mastering.
Percy Céspedez (Adammo, Gian Marco, TK) was elgido as director of his first video "For him" and later his second single "Looking". All this with the support of his manager Alexander Montoya and company management and production artists Music & Entertainment Group.
In 2010 "For him," the first single from the album, reached the top spot on various music channels like MTV Latin American and Latino Ritmonson, besides enjoying significant airplay in major Peruvian radios. The December 31, 2010, Mia was chosen by Radio Studio 92 as "Artist female revelation" and their debut song "For him," "Best Made Song in Peru" in 2010. In early 2011, the theme was chosen to rock the telenovela Lalola, Channel Frequency America.
The April 26, 2011, Mia was filed against professionals and leading companies in Latin music as a showcase of the Billboard Latin Music Conference and Awards.

His second single "Looking", like the first, scored dissemination at national and international level (HTV and MTV Latin America). The subject was placed in the top 10 rankings of pop rock and Latin music of Venezuela. 4 The song has a remix duet with Colombian singer and producer Fainal. Moreover, their second single managed to climb to number three in the Billboard ranking Latina in position Venezuela, in just one week premiered.
Mine traveled to Venezuela invited to participate in the event La Chica HTV, sharing the red carpet with other artists such as Chino y Nacho and David Bisbal.

Among the interviews provided the singer in Venezuela, for participation in programs like "La Bomba" by Televen channel and the "stew", the channel includes Tele. Following the success of their first two singles, Mia, with a more mature and produced the theme launched in. "One day." Was placed like previous chains HTV (number 1 on the Hot Ranking for four consecutive weeks) 5 and MTV Latin America.
The program looks in the HTV will devote a special issue to Mont.

Discography
2010: Antifantasía
2012: Antifantasía: Deluxe Edition
2013: Dhoom Machale (Dhoom 3)

Awards and nominations

Selected Radio Studio 92, Female Breakthrough Artist.
Nominated for Artist of 2011, Record Report.

References

External links

Official website

Official Youtube Channel
Mia Mont Dhoom Machale Spanish version

1989 births
Indigenous peoples in Peru
Living people
Peruvian singer-songwriters